In Australian and New Zealand English, a quarter acre is a term for a suburban plot of land. Traditionally, Australians and New Zealanders aspired to own a 3- or 4-bedroom house or bungalow on a section of around a quarter of an acre (about 1,000 square metres), also known locally as the Australian Dream or the New Zealand dream. The land was frequently put to use with vegetable gardens, fruit trees, or lawns for family recreation.

The quarter-acre aspiration has changed in recent decades, with sub-divisions, infill housing, apartments, and townhouses becoming more common in large cities, and nearby lifestyle farming blocks becoming popular.  Most "quarter-acre" sections are not exactly a quarter of an acre. With urban growth, properties tend to be smaller with new sub-divisions averaging a half or less of the classic quarter-acre.

See also
Rood, an Old English unit of area, equal to quarter of an acre
The Half-Gallon Quarter-Acre Pavlova Paradise, a popular book by Austin Mitchell

References

Australian culture
New Zealand culture
Housing in Australia